Dunlop is a Canadian local service district (LSD) in Gloucester County, New Brunswick. Most of the LSD is in Beresford Parish.

History

Notable people

See also
List of communities in New Brunswick

References

Communities in Gloucester County, New Brunswick
Designated places in New Brunswick
Local service districts of Gloucester County, New Brunswick